Mawsonia is a genus of fungi within the family Lichinaceae. It is a monotypic genus, containing the single species Mawsonia harrissonii.

The genus name of Mawsonia is in honour of Sir Douglas Mawson (1882–1958), who was an Australian geologist, Antarctic explorer, and academic. Along with Roald Amundsen, Robert Falcon Scott, and Sir Ernest Shackleton, he was a key expedition leader during the Heroic Age of Antarctic Exploration.

The genus was circumscribed by Carroll William Dodge in B.A.N.Z. Antarct. Res. Exped. Rep. ser. B, vol.7 on page 236 in 1948.

References

External links
Index Fungorum

Lichinomycetes
Lichen genera
Monotypic Ascomycota genera
Taxa named by Carroll William Dodge